Távora is a surname. Notable people with the surname include:

 Fernando Távora (1920-2005), Portuguese architect
 Francisco de Távora (1646–1710), Portuguese nobleman
 Franklin Távora (1842-1888), Brazilian novelist
 Luis Bernardo de Tavora (1723-1759), Portuguese nobleman
 Leonor Tomásia de Távora, 3rd Marquise of Távora (1700-1759), Portuguese noblewoman
 Sahil Tavora (born 1995), Indian footballer

Portuguese-language surnames